Tommaso de Vigilia (active 1480–1497) was an Italian painter of the Renaissance period.

Life
He was mainly active in Palermo. His earliest existing work is a triptych once belonging to the Duke of Verdura at Palermo, representing a Virgin and Child with four Saints, dated 1486; and his latest a St. Nicholas enthroned in a glory of Angels (1489) for the church of San Niccolo, Palermo. The ceiling of the church of the Santissima Annunziata, in the same city, is decorated with a series of sixteen scenes from the life of the Virgin, on canvas, by Tommaso. Other churches in Palermo possess paintings by him.

References

Sources

Painters from Palermo
15th-century Italian painters
Italian male painters
Painters from Sicily
Renaissance painters
Year of death unknown
Year of birth unknown